Deh Tall (also Romanized as Deh-e Tall and Deh Tal) is a village in Deh Tall Rural District, in the Central District of Bastak County, Hormozgan Province, Iran. At the 2006 census, its population was 1,425, in 293 families.

References 

Populated places in Bastak County